Brayden Tracey (born May 28, 2001) is a Canadian professional ice hockey winger currently playing for the San Diego Gulls in the American Hockey League (AHL) as a prospect to the Anaheim Ducks of the National Hockey League (NHL).

Playing career
He was selected by the Ducks with the 29th overall pick in the 2019 NHL Entry Draft.

Returning to the Warriors in the following 2019–20 season, Tracey was signed to a three-year, entry-level contract with the Ducks on November 28, 2019.

He played in his first NHL game on January 9, 2022 against the Detroit Red Wings, finishing the game with one shot on goal in 9:21 of ice time.

Career statistics

Regular season and playoffs

International

References

External links
 

2001 births
Living people
Anaheim Ducks draft picks
Anaheim Ducks players
Canadian ice hockey forwards
Moose Jaw Warriors players
National Hockey League first-round draft picks
San Diego Gulls (AHL) players
Ice hockey people from Calgary
Victoria Royals players